The 2008 OFC Men's Olympic Football Tournament functioned as the qualifying tournament to the association football competition at the 2008 Summer Olympics in Beijing for the member nations of the Oceania Football Confederation (OFC). The tournament consisted of a single round-robin tournament played in Fiji from 1 March to 9 March 2008. New Zealand won the tournament and qualified for the 2008 Olympic Games.

Final standings

Matches

Goal scorers

8 goals
 Benjamin Totori
 Malakai Tiwa

6 goals
 Tau Winnie

5 goals
 Alick Maemae

4 goals
 Costa Barbarouses
 Joachim Waroi
 Raymond Gunemba

3 goals

 Steven Old
 Jeremy Brockie
 Daniel Ellensohn
 Alvin Singh
 Roy Krishna
 Macui Dunadamu
 Jason Nawo

2 goals

 Jason Hayne
 Shameel Rao
 Joachim Rande
 David Muta
 Koriak Upaiga
 Jefferey Nimanian

1 goal

 Avinesh Waran Suwamy
 Krishna Samy
 Cole Peverley
 Craig Henderson
 Sam Messam
 Aaron Scott
 Franklin Forau
 Nelson Saie Kilifa
 Michael Fifii
 William Mobbs
 Samuel Kini
 Neil Hans
 Mathias Apo
 Francois Sakama
 Tony Chillia
 Michael Kaltack
 Fenedy Masauvakolo

External links
 Olympic Tournament Qualifying

OFC
Olympic Football Tournament, 2008
Oly
2008
2007–08 in New Zealand association football